Cerithium zebrum is a species of sea snail, a marine gastropod mollusk in the family Cerithiidae.

Description

Distribution
The distribution of Cerithium zebrum includes the Western Central Pacific.
 Guam

References

 Hasegawa K. (2017). Family Cerithiidae. Pp. 788-793, in: T. Okutani (ed.), Marine Mollusks in Japan, ed. 2. 2 vols. Tokai University Press. 1375 pp.

External links
 Gould A.A. (1849). [Descriptions of new species of shells, brought home by the U. S. Exploring Expedition. Proceedings of the Boston Society of Natural History. 3: 83-85, 89-92, 106-108, 118-121 [May 1849], 140-144]
 Deshayes G.P. (1863). Catalogue des mollusques de l'île de la Réunion (Bourbon). Pp. 1-144. In Maillard, L. (Ed.) Notes sur l'Ile de la Réunion. Dentu, Paris
 Melvill J.C. & Standen R. (1895) Notes on a collection of shells from Lifu and Uvea, Loyalty Islands, formed by the Rev. James and Mrs. Hadfield, with list of species. Journal of Conchology 8: 84–132, 3 pls
 Crosse H. (1863). [Book review of Catalogue des mollusques de l'île de la Réunion (Bourbon), par M. G.P. Deshayes. Journal de Conchyliologie. 11(4): 394-401]
 Houbrick R.S. (1993) Two confusing Indo-Pacific cerithiids. The Nautilus 107(1): 14-23
 Smith E.A. (1903). A list of species of Mollusca from South Africa, forming an Appendix to G. B. Sowerby's "Marine Shells of South Africa". Proceedings of the Malacological Society of London. 5(6): 354-402, pl. 15

Cerithiidae
Gastropods described in 1841